The Shadow Secretary of State for Wales or Shadow Welsh Secretary is a member of the UK Shadow Cabinet responsible for the scrutiny of the Secretary of State for Wales and his/her department, the Wales Office. The incumbent holder of the office is Jo Stevens.

List of Shadow Secretaries of State for Wales

References

See also 

Official Opposition (United Kingdom)